Leptodactylus hylodes is a species of frog in the family Leptodactylidae.
It is endemic to Brazil.
Its natural habitats are subtropical or tropical moist lowland forests and intermittent freshwater marshes.
It is threatened by habitat loss.

References

hylodes
Endemic fauna of Brazil
Amphibians described in 1862
Taxonomy articles created by Polbot